Agnew-Surpass Shoe Stores Ltd. was a Canadian shoe retailer.

In 1962 the chain was acquired by American firm Genesco, and in 1987 it was sold to a numbered company controlled by former Bata Shoe executive Michael Graye.

References

Defunct retail companies of Canada
Shoe companies of Canada
Footwear retailers